Rudy Florio (born March 26, 1950) is a former Canadian football running back who played six seasons in the Canadian Football League with the Montreal Alouettes and BC Lions. He was drafted by the BC Lions in the fifth round of the 1973 CFL Draft. He played college football at Youngstown State University. Florio also won the 20th Vanier Cup as an assistant coach with the Guelph Gryphons in 1984.

References

External links
Just Sports Stats

Living people
1950 births
Players of Canadian football from Ontario
Canadian football running backs
American football running backs
Canadian players of American football
Youngstown State Penguins football players
Montreal Alouettes players
BC Lions players
Sportspeople from Hamilton, Ontario